Niobrara State Park is a public recreation area located at the confluence of the Missouri and Niobrara rivers in the northeast corner of Nebraska. The state park occupies river bluffs to the west of the village of Niobrara and the Niobrara River. The park includes the Niobrara River Bridge, a decommissioned railroad bridge listed on the National Register of Historic Places. A variety of animals, notably  white-tailed deer and wild turkeys, roam the park by day, while at night, coyotes and whip-poor-wills mingle their cries and calls. The park is managed by the Nebraska Game and Parks Commission.

History
The first state park at the mouth of the Niobrara River was called Niobrara Island State Park. Niobrara Island had been a Niobrara town park until it was transferred to the state in 1930. Both the state and the Civilian Conservation Corps made improvements to the site in the 1930s. The park's present-day site opened in 1987 after the Nebraska Game and Parks Commission purchased 1,231 acres of higher land to the west of the original park. Cabins at the old park that were still in use in 1987 were subsequently abandoned because of high water in the area.

Activities and amenities
Park facilities include a swimming pool and interpretive center. The park offers RV and primitive camping as well as cabins that overlook the river.

References

External links

Niobrara State Park Nebraska Game and Parks Commission
Niobrara State Park Map Nebraska Game and Parks Commission

Protected areas of Knox County, Nebraska
Missouri River
State parks of Nebraska
Civilian Conservation Corps in Nebraska
Protected areas established in 1987
1987 establishments in Nebraska
Protected areas established in 1930
1930 establishments in Nebraska